The 2011 World Series of Poker was the 42nd annual World Series of Poker (WSOP).  The WSOP is the most prestigious poker tournament in the world with the winner of the Main Event considered to be the World Champion. It was held at the Rio All Suite Hotel and Casino in Las Vegas, Nevada between May 31 – July 19, 2011. There were 59 bracelet events, beginning with the WSOP National Circuit Championship and culminating in the $10,000 No Limit Hold'em Championship (also known as the "Main Event"). The November Nine concept returned for a fourth consecutive year, with the Main Event finalists returning on November 6, playing down to three that evening and then adjourning until November 8.

Coverage
The 2011 WSOP marked the first time that every event at the WSOP was covered nearly live. Due to the nature of the competition, live coverage was not allowed by the Nevada Gaming Commission. WSOP.com streamed 55 gold bracelet events on a five-minute delay via the internet.  ESPN3 streamed the $25K Heads Up, $50K Poker Players Championship and the Main Event online.

ESPN also doubled the airtime given to the WSOP from prior years.  For the first time ever, television coverage of the WSOP Main Event was "live" with a 30-minute delay. The "live" coverage of the WSOP Main Event ran for six consecutive days from July 14-19 and offered 32 additional hours of coverage, with Lon McEachern and David Tuchman handling the play-by-play commentary.

Poker PROductions, led by Mori Eskandani, produced the coverage of the 2011 WSOP, with the goal to enact changes that would put poker coverage on par with the coverage delivered for live sports. It was the first year for Poker PROductions producing the WSOP.

The final table of the WSOP Main Event was televised in its entirety on ESPN. As per Nevada Gaming Commission stipulations, play was broadcast with a 15-minute delay and the hole cards were not shown to the television audience until after the hand was over.

WSOP Circuit National Championship
Since 1970, the WSOP was held exclusively in Las Vegas, Nevada.  In 2004, Harrah's Entertainment purchased the rights to the WSOP and almost immediately started to expand the name brand.  After the purchase, Harrah's introduced Circuit Events around the country.  These events were intended to build up hype for the WSOP.  In 2011, they introduced WSOP Circuit National Championship.

The WSOP Circuit National Championship was an exclusive tournament, limited to 100 players who qualified through the circuit events.  The winner of the championship was awarded a WSOP bracelet.  The event, which took place from May 27 through May 29, was won by amateur player Sam Barnhart.

Player statistics
Through the first 57 events, the 2011 WSOP:
 awarded $127,468,010 in prize money.
 had 68,807 tournament entries.
 had 98 countries represented.
 had representation from all 50 U.S. states.
 had a male participation percentage of 94.7%.
 had one multiple bracelet winner.

The Main Event:
 had 6,865 entrants.
 had 85 countries represented.
 had representation from all 50 U.S. states.
 had a male participation percentage of 96.5%.
 had 4,604 participants from the U.S.
 had 2,265 participants from other countries.

Events

Main Event
The $10,000 No Limit Hold'em Championship began on July 7 with the first of four starting days. After reaching the final table of nine players on July 19, the remainder of the tournament was delayed until November 6.

The Main Event drew 6,865 players, creating a prize pool of $64,531,000. The top 693 finishers placed in the money, with first place paying $8,715,638. The Main Event was won by Pius Heinz. 
There were 301 hands played at the final table, including 119 hands of heads-up play, which was the most in WSOP Main Event history.

Celebrities
Several celebrities also participated in the Main Event:

Day 1-A: Jason Alexander, Vincent Van Patten
Day 1-B: Sam Simon, Patrick Bruel
Day 1-C: Paul Pierce, Brad Garrett, Petter Northug, Audley Harrison, Shane Warne, Ray Romano, Robert Iler
Day 1-D: Jennifer Tilly, Shannon Elizabeth, Nelly, René Angélil, Mars Callahan, Colson Whitehead
Of these celebrities, Sam Simon (500th), Robert Iler (275th) and Mars Callahan (94th) finished in the money.

Performance of past champions
 * Indicates a player who finished in the money.

Other notable high finishes
NB: This list is restricted to top 30 finishers with an existing Wikipedia entry.

November Nine

*Career statistics prior to the beginning of the 2011 Main Event.

Final table payouts

References 

World Series of Poker
World Series of Poker